Paphiopedilum haynaldianum is a species of orchid endemic to the islands of Negros and Luzon of the Philippines.

Varieties
Paphiopedilum haynaldium var. laurae

haynaldianum
Orchids of the Philippines